Morgan County is the name of eleven counties in the United States of America, nine of which were named for Daniel Morgan, Revolutionary War General:
Morgan County, Alabama
Morgan County, Colorado (named for Colonel Christopher A. Morgan)
Morgan County, Georgia
Morgan County, Illinois
Morgan County, Indiana
Morgan County, Kentucky
Morgan County, Missouri
Morgan County, Ohio
Morgan County, Tennessee
Morgan County, Utah (named for Jedediah Morgan Grant, father of Heber J. Grant) 
Morgan County, West Virginia